Ewan Robert Mitchell  is an English actor. He is known for his roles in the ITV period drama The Halcyon (2017), the medieval series The Last Kingdom (2017–2022), the BBC war drama World on Fire (2019–), and the HBO fantasy series House of the Dragon (2022–). He has also appeared in the ITV crime thriller Trigger Point (2022) and Claire Denis' film High Life (2018).

Early life 
Mitchell was born and raised in Derby. He trained at the Central Junior Television Workshop in Nottingham.

Career 
Mitchell began his acting career in 2015, upon graduating high school, starring in the short films Stereotype and Fire. He later starred in the films Just Charlie (2017) by Rebekah Fortune and High Life (2018) by Claire Denis. In 2022, he was cast in an Amazon Prime Video original film, Emerald Fennell's Saltburn.

On television, Mitchell made his debut in the 2017 ITV period drama The Halcyon as Billy Taylor. He had his breakout role in the BBC Two and Netflix historical drama The Last Kingdom as Osferth, a role he played from the second to fifth series. In 2019, he starred as Tom Bennett in the BBC One World War II drama series World on Fire.

In 2022, Mitchell appeared in the ITV crime thriller Trigger Point as Billy Washington. Later that year, Mitchell began playing Prince Aemond Targaryen in the HBO fantasy series House of the Dragon, a Game of Thrones prequel and adaptation of George R. R. Martin's fictional history book Fire and Blood. His performance in the series received critical acclaim.

Filmography

Film

Television

References

External links 
 
 
 Ewan Mitchell at Independent Talent

21st-century English male actors
English male film actors
English male television actors
Living people
Male actors from Derbyshire
People from Derby
1997 births